Milla Nova is a Ukrainian clothing brand of bridal fashion producing wedding dress and evening wear founded in 2002. In 20 years company opened stocks and operating in 50 countries including US, UK, France and China.

History 

In 2002 two sisters, Zoryana and Iryna Senyshyn, launched small atelier in Lviv, Ukraine. Same year Mira Brewusz joined the team as creative director, and at the end of the year team consist of 15 employees. The «Milla Nova» brand and company was founded in 2014 and branded boutique opened in 2017.

In 2019 company collections for the first time showed at international fashion event in Barcelona.

Since 2020 company launched online store and focused on Internet sales due to COVID-19 safety restrictions.

In October 2022, Milla Nova with a new collection presented at New York Bridal Fashion Week has become the first Ukrainian brand participated in New York's bridal market.

Social investment 

As 95% of the company's employees are women, workplaces at company adopted to be safe for mothers with kids.

Since the beginning of COVID-19 pandemic in Ukraine the brand's factory sewed masks and protective suits for local hospitals' medical staff.

In the spring month of 2022, right after the start of a full-scale Russian invasion of Ukraine manufacturing facilities and half of half of employees relocated to Warsaw, Poland and company focused on producing attire for the Ukrainian Army soldiers and scrubs for health and medical workers of Ukrainian hospitals.

In September 2022, Milla Nova, together with ELLE Ukraine magazine, made a social promotion of wedding stories of Ukrainian veterans getting married during ongoing Russo-Ukrainian War.

Collaborations 

Company collaborated with many celebrities and public figures from different countries, such as French novelist Géraldine Dalban-Moreynas, German fashion influencer Leonie Hanne, British actress Lucy Watson, English television personality Jess Wright.

Awards 

Company boutique, located at the UNESCO World Heritage Site «Lviv's Old Town», awarded and granted by mayor of Lviv as the 2nd (in 2019) and the 1st (in 2020) place winner of «The Best Christmas and New Year Display Window» yearly competition organized by Lviv City Council since 2007.

References

External links 

 Milla Nova website
 Old website (in Ukrainian). Archived 2017-06-03.

Clothing companies established in 2002
Ukrainian brands
Wedding dress designers
Ukrainian clothing
Manufacturing companies of Ukraine